This is a list of letters of the Latin script.  The definition of a Latin-script letter for this list is a character encoded in the Unicode Standard that has a script property of 'Latin' and the general category of 'Letter'.  An overview of the distribution of Latin-script letters in Unicode is given in Latin script in Unicode.

Basic Latin

Extensions

Letters with diacritics

Ligatures

See also
List of Latin digraphs
Ligatures in Unicode

Multigraphs
Trigraph
Tetragraph
Pentagraph
Hexagraph

Other characters

Other Latin characters are omitted from the tables above:
 Subscript modifier letters a, e, h-p, and r-v, and x: ₐ ₑ ₕ ᵢ ⱼ ₖ ₗ ₘ ₙ ₒ ₚ ᵣ ₛ ₜ ᵤ ᵥ ₓ (See Unicode subscripts and superscripts for full list.)
 Superscript modifier letters A-R, T-W and a-z: ᴬ ᴮ ꟲ ᴰ ᴱ ꟳ ᴳ ᴴ ᴵ ᴶ ᴷ ᴸ ᴹ ᴺ ᴼ ᴾ ꟴ ᴿ ᵀ ᵁ ⱽ ᵂ ᵃ ᵇ ᶜ ᵈ ᵉ ᶠ ᵍ ʰ ⁱ ʲ ᵏ ˡ ᵐ ⁿ ᵒ ᵖ 𐞥 ʳ ˢ ᵗ ᵘ ᵛ ʷ ˣ ʸ ᶻ (See Unicode subscripts and superscripts for full list.)
 Feminine (ª) and masculine (º) ordinal indicators
 Fullwidth forms for typesetting Latin characters in a CJK environment: Ａａ Ｂｂ Ｃｃ Ｄｄ Ｅｅ Ｆｆ Ｇｇ Ｈｈ Ｉｉ Ｊｊ Ｋｋ Ｌｌ Ｍｍ Ｎｎ Ｏｏ Ｐｐ Ｑｑ Ｒｒ Ｓｓ Ｔｔ Ｕｕ Ｖｖ Ｗｗ Ｘｘ Ｙｙ Ｚｚ
 Deprecated Unicode letter named "n preceded by apostrophe": ŉ (This is a legacy compatibility character for ISO/IEC 6937 and 'n with separate apostrophe and letter N characters should be used in its place.)

Footnotes

See also
Latin-script multigraph
Typographic ligature
Latin characters in Unicode
Phonetic symbols in Unicode
List of Latin letters by shape
:Category:Latin-script ligatures
:Category:Palaeographic letters
:Category:Phonetic transcription symbols
:Category:Letters with diacritics
:Category:Latin-script letters